Angus Frantz (June 20, 1895 – July 16, 1973) was an American wrestler. He competed in the freestyle middleweight event at the 1920 Summer Olympics.

References

External links
 

1895 births
1973 deaths
Olympic wrestlers of the United States
Wrestlers at the 1920 Summer Olympics
American male sport wrestlers
Sportspeople from Duluth, Minnesota